Silchester is a village and civil parish about  north of Basingstoke in Hampshire.

Silchester is most notable for the archaeological site and Roman town of Calleva Atrebatum, an Iron Age and later Atrebates Celtic settlement first occupied by the Romans in about AD 45, and which includes what is considered the best-preserved Roman wall in Great Britain and the remains of what may be one of the oldest Christian churches.

Location
The present village is centred on Silchester Common.

Local government
Silchester is a civil parish with an elected parish council. Silchester parish is in the ward of Pamber and Silchester, part of Basingstoke and Deane District Council and of Hampshire County Council and all three councils are responsible for different aspects of local government. The ward returns two councillors to the borough council. The 2011 census recorded a parish population of 921.

Transport
Silchester Common is served (as of October 2017) by bus route 14 between Basingstoke, Chineham Shopping Centre, Bramley, Little London, Silchester Common and Tadley, operated by Stagecoach on Monday to Saturday.

Manor
Silcester was recorded in the 11th century, when one Alestan held a manor here with King Edward the Confessor as his overlord and one Cheping held another manor with Earl Harold Godwinson as his overlord. The Domesday Book of 1086 recorded that the Normans William De Ow and Ralph de Mortimer possessed Alestan's and Cheping's manors respectively. The book assessed Alestan's manor at five hides and Mortimer's at three hides. De Mortimer's tenant was another Norman, Ralph Bluet. In 1204 he or a later Ralph Bluet gave a palfrey horse in exchange for a licence to enclose an area of land south-east of the former Roman town as a deer park. Today parts of the earthwork park pale survive and parts of the former park remain wooded.

Forms of the toponym included Ciltestere and Cilcestre in the 13th century, Scilchestre in the 14th century and Sylkchester in the 18th century before it reached its current spelling.

The Irish peer Murrough Boyle, 1st Viscount Blesington (1685–1718) bought the manor in 1704 and it remained with his hereditary heirs until the death of William Stewart, 1st Earl of Blessington in 1769. In 1778 it was inherited jointly by Thomas Vesey, 1st Viscount de Vesci and Edward Pakenham, 2nd Baron Longford. In 1806 Baron Longford's daughter The Hon. Catherine Pakenham married Arthur Wellesley, who in 1814 was created Duke of Wellington. In 1821 Catherine's brother Thomas Pakenham, 2nd Earl of Longford was created Baron Silchester, but in 1828 he and John, 2nd Viscount de Vesci sold the manor of Silchester to the Duke. In the first decade of the 20th century Arthur Wellesley, 4th Duke of Wellington still owned the manor of Silchester.

Church and chapel

The Church of England parish church of St Mary the Virgin is just within the walls of the former Roman town, possibly on the site of a Roman temple.  The building may contain some re-used Roman materials. The building dates from the late 12th or early 13th century. It has a north and south aisle, each of two bays. There is no chancel arch, and the chancel is longer than the nave. The wall of the south aisle was rebuilt in about 1325–50, incorporating an ogee-arched tomb recess containing the effigy of a lady wearing a wimple. Two new windows were added to the church in the 14th century, and two more including the Perpendicular Gothic east window of the chancel in the 15th century.

The church has a Perpendicular Gothic rood screen. The pulpit was made early in the 18th century but its tester is dated 1639. There is also a carved memorial cartouche to the Irish peer Viscount Ikerrin (died 1712). The bell-turret has a ring of five bells. Four were cast by John Stares of Aldbourne, Wiltshire in 1744. The other was cast by William Taylor of Oxford in 1848.

There is a Primitive Methodist chapel on Silchester Common.

Iron Age and Roman town

Calleva Atrebatum was an Iron Age oppidum and subsequently a town in the Roman province of Britannia and the civitas capital of the Atrebates tribe.

The site covers an area of over  within a polygonal earthwork. The earthworks and extensive ruined walls are still visible. The remains of the amphitheatre, added about AD 70–80 and situated outside the city walls, can also be clearly seen. The area inside the walls is now largely farmland with no visible distinguishing features, other than the enclosing earthworks and walls, with the church and old manor house in one corner.

Silchester was the subject of antiquarian interest from the 16th century onwards. The bronze Silchester eagle was discovered in the Basilica at Calleva in 1866 and can now be seen in Reading Museum. The most extensive excavations were carried out by the Society of Antiquaries from 1890 until 1909 under George E. Fox and W. H. St. J. Hope. During excavations carried out in 1893, the Silchester Ogham stone was located. Dated c. 500 AD, it is one of very few found in England. It is now held in storage at Reading Museum. The inscription on the ogham stone was in the Latin alphabet, but in Irish and appears to be indicating that the property belonged to someone named Tebicatos. The precise identity of Tebicatos remains a mystery, but it is possible that he was a pilgrim or a mercenary. 

Analysis of plant remains shows that Calleva residents had access to typcal foods eaten in Roman Britain, such as cereals, coriander, and cultivated fruits. They also received imports of exotic medlar and mulberry fruits.

Calleva was finally abandoned in the 7th century, which is unusually late compared to other deserted Roman settlement.

Amenities
Silchester's sole public house is the Calleva Arms, named after the former Roman town of Calleva Atrebatum that lies within the village boundary.  It was known as The Crown prior to being renamed.

The parish has regular events and village activities through the year including a beer festival, fun run, church fete, and music festival. The village has an amateur dramatic society and a village association.

Silchester Cricket Club compete in Regional Division Three North East in the Hampshire Cricket League.

School
Silchester has a Church of England aided primary school. Most Silchester children of secondary school age attend The Hurst School in Baughurst.

Awards
Silchester was voted "Hampshire Village of the Year" (2008) and "South England Village of the Year" (2009) in the Calor Village of the Year competition.

Silchester Environs Project 
The University of Reading is leading a five-year archaeological research project to explore the later prehistoric use of the landscape around Silchester Roman Town and its underlying Late Iron Age oppidum (ancient Celtic fortified town). To date (2020) the project has identified 671 new archaeological sites, from the Neolithic through to WWII, in addition to the 267 already known. A number of reports on the archaeological investigations have been published by Historic England.

Notable persons
 Alys Fowler - gardener
 Earl of Longford - from 1821 peerage of Baron Silchester
 Thomas Pakenham (historian)
 Thomas Powys - clergyman
 William Stewart, 1st Earl of Blessington - buried Silchester
 James Crowdy (cricketer)
 Richard Carte - composer
 Dudley Fishburn
 Jonathan Shipley - clergyman
 Victoria Monks - music hall singer

See also
 Ring of Silvianus, an ancient ring that possibly inspired the One Ring in The Lord of the Rings, found near the town in 1785.
 Silchester eagle, a Roman bronze casting found in Silchester.

References

Sources and further reading

External links

Excavations of Roman remains by Reading university
Reading Museum web site on Silchester Roman Town
British History Victorian account of the village

Villages in Hampshire
Civil parishes in Basingstoke and Deane